Raita is an Indian/Pakistani condiment based on yogurt.

Raita may also refer to:

People with the surname
 Henna Raita, Finnish alpine skier
 Marjatta Raita, Finnish actress
 Mikko Raita, Finnish music mixing and recording engineer and producer

People with the given name
, Japanese cyclist

See also 
 Raita Plot, one of the neighbourhoods of Shah Faisal Town in Karachi, Sindh, Pakistan
 Rhaita, a type of oboe used in Morocco
 Raita algorithm, a string-searching algorithm